Milorad Čikić (born 1 August 1950 in Valjevo) is a Serbian former sprinter who competed in the 1972 Summer Olympics.

References

1950 births
Living people
Serbian male sprinters
Yugoslav male sprinters
Sportspeople from Valjevo
Olympic athletes of Yugoslavia
Athletes (track and field) at the 1972 Summer Olympics
Mediterranean Games gold medalists for Yugoslavia
Mediterranean Games bronze medalists for Yugoslavia
Athletes (track and field) at the 1975 Mediterranean Games
Mediterranean Games medalists in athletics
Universiade medalists in athletics (track and field)
Universiade silver medalists for Yugoslavia